Château de Montbron (Landes) is a château in the commune of Biscarrosse, in Landes, Nouvelle-Aquitaine, France. It dates to the 16th century.

Notes

Houses completed in the 16th century
Châteaux in Landes (department)